Piazza di Spagna ("Spanish Square"), at the bottom of the Spanish Steps, is one of the most famous squares in Rome, Italy. It owes its name to the Palazzo di Spagna, the seat of the Embassy of Spain to the Holy See. There is also the famed Column of the Immaculate Conception  of the Blessed Virgin Mary.

The square

In the middle of the square is the famous Fontana della Barcaccia, dating to the beginning of the baroque period, sculpted by Pietro Bernini and his son, the more famous Gian Lorenzo Bernini.

At the right corner of the Spanish Steps rises the house of the English poet John Keats, who lived there until his death in 1821: nowadays it has been changed into a museum dedicated to him and his friend Percy Bysshe Shelley, displaying books and memorabilia of English romanticism. At the left corner, there is the Babington's tea room, founded in 1893.

The side near Via Frattina is overlooked by the two façades (the main one, designed by Gian Lorenzo Bernini, and the side one created by Francesco Borromini) of the Palazzo di Propaganda Fide, a property of the Holy See. In front of it, actually in a part of Piazza di Spagna named Piazza Mignanelli, rises the Column of the Immaculate Conception, erected in 1856, two years after the proclamation of the dogma.

The Spanish Steps

The imposing 135-step staircase was inaugurated by Pope Benedict XIII during the 1725 Jubilee; it was released (thanks to French loans granted in 1721–1725) to connect the Bourbon Spanish embassy (from which the square takes its name) to the Church of Trinità dei Monti.

It was designed by Alessandro Specchi and Francesco De Sanctis after generations of long and glowing discussions about how to urbanize the steep slope on the side of the Pincian Hill to connect it to the church. The final key was the one proposed by Francesco De Sanctis: a great staircase decorated with many garden-terraces, splendidly adorned with flowers in spring and summer. The sumptuous, aristocratic staircase, at the summit of a straight sequence of streets leading down to the Tiber, was designed so that the scenic effects increase more and more while approaching it. In effect, the creation of long, deep perspectives culminating in monumental wings or backdrops was typical of the great baroque architecture. The Spanish Steps were restored in 1995.

Monuments and places of interest

Palazzi 
Palazzo di Propaganda Fide
Palazzo di Spagna, seat of the Spanish embassy to the Holy See

Monuments and museums 
Trinità dei Monti
Keats-Shelley Memorial House
Giorgio De Chirico House
Column of the Immaculate Conception
Fountain of the Babuino
Spanish Steps
Fontana della Barcaccia

Schools 
Collegio San Giuseppe - Istituto De Merode

Other 
Babington's tea room
Spagna (Rome Metro)

External links
Spanish Steps Rome The official website of the Association of Piazza di Spagna. 
Detailed information and 19th-century photographs and etchings by Giuseppe Vasi
The Spanish Steps - 360° Panorama (QuickTime VR)
Photo gallery
 Piazza di Spagna on Secret Rome

Spagna
Baroque architecture in Rome
Rome R. IV Campo Marzio